Baryliv is a small village (selo) in Chervonohrad Raion, Lviv Oblast of Western Ukraine. It belongs to Lopatyn settlement hromada, one of the hromadas of Ukraine. The area of the village is just 1,48 km2 and the population of village is just about 427 persons. Local government is administered by Barylivska village council.

Geography 
The village Baryliv is situated in the north of Lviv region (Lviv Oblast ), near the borders of Volyn Oblast.

History 
The oldest record of the village refers to 1448. Although the official founding date of the village dates back to 1575 year.
From 1919 to 1939 village Baryliv together with the Radekhiv Raion was annexed to the Lwów Voivodeship, Second Polish Republic. After the war territory was passed to the Soviet Union. Since 1991 it has been part of independent Ukraine.

Until 18 July 2020, Baryliv belonged to Radekhiv Raion. The raion was abolished in July 2020 as part of the administrative reform of Ukraine, which reduced the number of raions of Lviv Oblast to seven. The area of Radekhiv Raion was merged into Chervonohrad Raion.

Cult constructions and religion 
In the village has an old wooden church, which is registered in the Catalog Wooden Churches of Ukraine. It is the Church of St. Simeon 1885 (wooden).

Famous people 
 Myron Tarnavsky (1869 – 1938) – a supreme commander of the Ukrainian Galician Army, the military of the West Ukrainian People's Republic. He was born into a family of priests in the village Baryliv, Lviv region.

References

External links 
 village Baryliv
 weather.in.ua

Literature 
 Історія міст і сіл УРСР : Львівська область, Тершів. – К. : ГРУРЕ, 1968 р. Page 635 
 Василь Слободян, КАТАЛОГ ІСНУЮЧИХ ДЕРЕВ'ЯНИХ ЦЕРКОВ УКРАЇНИ І УКРАЇНСЬКИХ ЕТНІЧНИХ ЗЕМЕЛЬ 

Villages in Chervonohrad Raion